Stora Träsket Nature Reserve is a nature reserve in Botkyrka Municipality close to Stockholm, Sweden.

The nature reserve protects an area of wildlife around the lake Stora Träsket. These areas are a habitat for, among other species, the orchid Hammarbya paludosa and several species of sundew. On land, the lake is surrounded by old-growth forest containing several species which are used to identify areas of high ecological value; these include Goodyera repens, Chimaphila umbellata and Geastrum pectinatum, among others.

The hiking trail Sörmlandsleden passes through the nature reserve.

References

External links

Nature reserves in Sweden
Geography of Stockholm County